Over the years, Nagpur has equipped with advanced and highly sophisticated hospitals. The district is enveloped with many hospitals, clinics, nursing homes enabling quality medical care at the doorstep for the residents and neighbors of Nagpur. Medical specialties offered by the government, charitable, multi-specialty hospitals as well as private clinics include Oncology, Cardiology, Ophthalmology, Urology, etc.

Following is the List  of Hospitals and medical Research Centers in Nagpur.

References

Nagpur
Buildings and structures in Nagpur
Hospitals

Hospitals in Nagpur